Imel may refer to:

Imeľ, a village in Komarno District in south Slovakia
Jack Imel (1932–2017) of the Lawrence Welk Show